Eugnosta sebasta is a species of moth of the family Tortricidae. It is found in Mexico (Baja California Norte).

References

Moths described in 1994
Eugnosta